Francisco José Domingo y Marqués (12 March 1842 – 22 July 1920) was a Spanish painter in the Eclectic style.

Biography 

In 1864, he moved to Madrid to continue his studies at the Real Academia de Bellas Artes de San Fernando with Federico de Madrazo. Three years later, he was awarded a pension by the "Diputación Provincial de Valencia" (the local government) to continue his studies in Rome. He went there in 1868, where he obtained a position in the workshop of Eduardo Rosales.

While there, he sent his works to the National Exhibition of Fine Arts, winning several awards for his Baroque-style paintings. Suffering from the effects of malarial fever, he returned to Spain and taught at the Academia de San Carlos for a year. His portrait of Santa Clara praying won First Prize at the Exhibition of 1871. That same year, his pension was cancelled, as he showed no inclination to return to Rome. As a result, he moved to Madrid, where he found work decorating various buildings, including the palace of Eduardo, Duque de Bailén.

He married in 1874 and, the following year, moved to Paris, where his works consisted largely of detailed historical genre scenes and portraits for high society patrons, many of whom were former clients of Marià Fortuny. During this time, he absorbed some elements from the style of Meissonier as well as brightening his palette under the influence of the Impressionists. His paintings were bought by Paris based art dealer Etienne Haro. He also made contacts with art dealers in the United States. William Henry Vanderbilt and Augustin Daly were among those who bought his paintings.

Benezit Dictionary of Artists His Benezit entry is entered as "Domingo y Marques (Francisco)" The entry shows him winning the Prix de Rome 1867. Professor of The Academy of St Charles, Valencia, 1868. Member of the Academy Royale of Antwerp, 1889. It also records some of his works and sales. The Etienne Haro sales of 1892 and 1897 record the two studies titled a Votre Sante, (see the first A Votre Propre Sante below)

In 1914, at the start of World War I, he returned to Madrid, moving in with his son Roberto (1883-1956), who was also an artist; widely known for his paintings of bullfights.  Three years later, he became a member of the Academia de San Fernando. In 1918, his work was the subject of a retrospective and tribute in his native Valencia. He was also a recipient of the "Civil Order of Alfonso X, the Wise". He died in Madrid, aged 78.

Selected paintings

References

Further reading
Francisco Domingo, Valencia, Fundación Bancaja (1998)  
Carmen Gracia Baneyto, "Francisco Domingo y el mercado de la `High Class Painting'", from Fragmentos, nos.15-16, Madrid (1989) 
Santiago Rodríguez García, El pintor Francisco Domingo Marqués. Resumen de su vida y significación de su obra, Valencia, Círculo de Bellas Artes (1950).

External links 

ArtNet: More works by Domingo

1842 births
1920 deaths
Painters from the Valencian Community
Spanish portrait painters
Spanish genre painters
People from Valencia
Spanish expatriates in France
19th-century Spanish painters
19th-century Spanish male artists
Spanish male painters
20th-century Spanish painters
20th-century Spanish male artists
Real Academia de Bellas Artes de San Fernando alumni